Hum Tum Shabana is a 2011 Indian romantic comedy film. It stars Tusshar Kapoor, Shreyas Talpade & Minissha Lamba in lead roles.

Plot
Hum Tum Shabana is a comedy movie revolving around three characters, played by Tusshar Kapoor, Shreyas Talpade, and Minissha Lamba. The two men compete to woo the woman, but then it turns into a desperate battle to lose her. Despite gaining negative reviews the film did good business and was declared an above average grosser.

Cast
 Tusshar Kapoor as Rishi Malhotra
 Shreyas Talpade as Karthik Iyer
 Minissha Lamba as Shabana Raza
 Sanjay Mishra as Munna Military (Manoj Tyagi)
 Mantra as Nandu
 Satish Kaushik as Chacha Panju
 Pia Trivedi as Rhea Dixit
 Rahul Singh as Ravi Aggarwal
 Rajesh Khattar as Vikram Malhotra
 Pooja Batra as Puja (Cameo Appearance)
 Surveen Chawla as Shabana (Cameo Appearance)
 Madhur Bhandarkar as himself (Cameo Appearance)
Karmveer Choudhary as Gangster 
 Vaarssh Bhatnagar as Bittu

Soundtrack

The music of the film was composed by music director duo Sachin–Jigar.

 "Musik Bandh Na Karo" - Abhishek Nailwal, Palash Sen,  Anushka Manchanda
 "Hey Na Na Shabana" - Raghav Mathur	
 "Thank U Mr DJ" - Mika Singh, Suzanna D'Mello
 "Piya Kesariyo" -  Anushka Manchanda, Jigar Saraiya
 "Kaari Kaari" - Vijay Prakash, Shalini Singh, Tochi Raina - Lyrics: Mayur Puri
 "Hey Na Na Shabana" (Party Map Remix) Remix - DJ Akhil Talreja
 "Musik Bandh Na Karo" (Remix)  Remix - Kiran Kamath

Reception

Critical response 
Hum Tum Shabana received negative reviews all throughout. Preeti Arora of rediff.com said, "... an unashamed attempt to ape the Golmaal series, Hum Tum Shabana is a rudderless ship which simultaneously endeavors to straddle many genres. And fails miserably," and gave it half a star out of 5 stars. The Indian Express rated it half a star as well. Popular film critic and trade analyst Taran Adarsh, who gave it 1.5 out of 5 stars, said that it has a funny first half but a disappointing second hour. 
Nupur Barua of fullhyd.com lamented the fact that Sagar Ballary, the director, "seems to prefer the Golmaal and Dhamaal styles, rather than that of his first film [Bheja Fry]." fullhyd.com rated the movie 4/10. Times Of India's Nikhat Kazmi wasn't positive about the film either, and rated it 2/5.

References

External links
 
 

2010s Hindi-language films
2011 films
2011 romantic comedy films
Films directed by Sagar Ballary
Indian romantic comedy films